Awutu may refer to:

Awutu language
A region of Ghana, included in
Awutu/Effutu/Senya District
Awutu Senya East (municipal district)
Awutu Senya West (district)
Awutu-Senya (Ghana parliament constituency)